Darius Behzad "Dari" Nowkhah (born June 23, 1976) is the lead anchor at SEC Network, an American sports television network. On August 21, 2014, The SEC Network began airing, and Nowkhah was chosen to be the head anchor. Nowkhah hosts extensive college football and college basketball programming for the collegiate network.  Nowkhah also provides play-by-play for the network's college basketball and college baseball coverage.

Nowkhah's move to ESPNU's Charlotte, NC headquarters came after seven years in Bristol, CT where he hosted a variety of shows for ESPN.  Among the shows Nowkhah hosted were SportsCenter, Baseball Tonight and College Football Live.

He fills in as a host on a variety of other ESPN Radio programs. Before working at ESPN, Nowkhah worked at KCFW-TV in Kalispell, Montana as well as KLKN-TV in Lincoln, Nebraska and KOTV in Tulsa.

Nowkhah graduated from Union High School in Tulsa, Oklahoma, and then from the University of Oklahoma in 1998 with a degree in broadcast journalism.

Personal life
Nowkhah and wife Jenn have four children. On Tuesday, September 20, 2011, Dari announced his infant son, Hayden, died from complications arising from myocarditis, a viral infection that compromised the heart.  Nowkhah and his wife have since set up Hayden's Hope, a foundation dedicated to helping families cover expenses due to their children's organ transplants.

Nowkhah is the son of Cy Nowkhah, a 1975 University of Tulsa graduate who immigrated to the United States from Iran in 1969.

Controversy 

In a live televised interview after the 2019 semi-final game, Nowkhah asked LSU quarterback Joe Burrow about the death of Carley McCord, daughter-in-law of LSU offensive coordinator Steve Ensminger. Burrow was surprised by the news of the death, having not known beforehand, and Nowkhah drew criticism and apologized on Twitter.

References

External links
ESPN Bio

Living people
1976 births
American television sports anchors
College basketball announcers in the United States
College football announcers
American people of Iranian descent
Sportspeople from Tulsa, Oklahoma
College baseball announcers in the United States